Dolores Gonçalves Costa (23 June 1905 – 19 July 2008), known by her stage name Dercy Gonçalves, was a Brazilian actress, comedian and singer. In her 86-year-long career, she worked in the theater, revues, film, radio and television, becoming famous by her humorous use of vulgar language. In 1991, at the age of 85, she caused controversy by exposing her breasts while parading with a Samba school in Rio de Janeiro's Carnaval.

Gonçalves is recognized by Guinness World Records as having the longest acting career ever having acted from 1922 to 2008.

Biography 

Dercy Gonçalves was biographed in 1994 by Maria Adelaide Amaral. The book was titled Dercy de Cabo a Rabo (a popular expression in Portuguese that means "from the beginning to the end", and in this particular case, "The complete Dercy"). Amaral also adapted her book into the 2012 miniseries Dercy de Verdade ("The true Dercy"). Dercy Gonçalves was portrayed by Luiza Périssé (teen), Heloísa Périssé (young) and Fafy Siqueira (older).

She died on 19 July 2008 from pneumonia at the age of 103. She was buried in her birth town Santa Maria Madalena in Rio de Janeiro. Her mausoleum, designed by herself in 1991, has the shape of a glass pyramid. The conception is similar to Louvre Pyramid.

Filmography

References

External links 

Dercy Gonçalves Turns 100
People Magazine on Penthouse

1907 births
2008 deaths
Deaths from pneumonia in Rio de Janeiro (state)
Brazilian centenarians
People from Rio de Janeiro (state)
Brazilian women comedians
20th-century comedians
Women centenarians